Silent Hill 2 is an upcoming survival horror video game developed by Bloober Team and published by Konami. It is a remake of the 2001 game of the same name, originally developed by Konami Computer Entertainment Japan (KCEJ) subsidiary Team Silent as the second installment of the Silent Hill video game franchise and will be the first major installment in the Silent Hill video game series since Silent Hill: Downpour (2012). Like the original game, it follows James Sunderland (Luke Roberts), a widower who returns to the eponymous town of Silent Hill upon receiving a letter from his deceased wife Mary, who claims to be waiting there for him.

The remake of the game was officially announced in October 2022 following months of speculation and leaks, and is the first game in an ongoing initiative by Konami to rejuvenate mainstream interest in the franchise, which hadn't seen a new major entry since the release of Silent Hill: Book of Memories (2012) and the subsequent cancellation of Silent Hills from former internal studio Kojima Productions. The remake is being led by Bloober Team creative director Mateusz Lenart, while it is being produced by Motoi Okamoto from Konami. Masahiro Ito and Akira Yamaoka, who respectively served as creature designer and composer for the original game, will return to reprise their duties for the remake.

The game is set to be released for PlayStation 5 and Windows.

Gameplay
Silent Hill 2 will feature an "over-the-shoulder" third-person perspective, similar to the recent remakes in the Resident Evil franchise, with a revised combat system.

Development
Silent Hill 2, developed by Team Silent and published by Konami for PlayStation 2, released in September 2001 as a sequel to the PlayStation title Silent Hill (1999). The game enjoyed immense critical and commercial success, becoming labeled as one of the best video games of all time by numerous games and media publications. Praise was directed towards its narrative, which some considered to be the best in the entire series, the graphics which were remarked upon as cutting edge for the seamless transition between computer-generated imagery (CGI) to gameplay, and its setting & atomsphere, in part attributed to the sense of claustrophobia acheived by the constant presence of the fog engulfing the titular town.

In June 2021, Polish developer Bloober Team announced that they had embarked on a "strategic co-operation agreeement" with Konami that would involve "jointly developing selected contents and exchanging know-how" with the publisher. Bloober Team CEO Piotr Babieno commented on the deal, asserting that "The fact that such a renowned company as Konami has decided to strategically cooperate with the Bloober Team means that we [have] also joined the world leaders in gaming and become an equal partner for the leading players in this market". Konami issued a separate statement, with the publisher remarking, "We don’t have any specifics to share at this time, but we can say while Bloober Team will continue to produce their own original content, we’re excited at the chance to collaborate with them on potential projects across our various IP".

In September 2022, a series of leaks revealed purported images sourced from a planned remake of Silent Hill 2 to be developed by Bloober Team, adding to substantiated reports that Konami was supervising an initiative to revive the series by outsourcing future games to collaborative developers. An internet leaker with the username "Dusk Golem" alleged that the images were taken from an internal test demo Bloober Team developed to pitch the project to Konami, and as a result did not represent the final title. The leaked images were subsequently taken down by Konami representatives. Another leak alluding to the game appeared the following month, through a YouTube description for a trailer accidentally made public by Konami themselves.

The game was officially announced by Konami during their Silent Hill Transmission presentation in October 2022, alongside the games Silent Hill f, Silent Hill: Townfall and Silent Hill: Ascension, as well as the film Return to Silent Hill. It was confirmed at the presentation that creature designer Masahiro Ito and original composer Akira Yamaoka would return to contribute to the remake. Bloober Team creative director and lead designer Mateusz Lenart cited the importance of "preserving the atmosphere that made Silent Hill 2 so exceptional, while modernizing many aspects of the game's overall gameplay" as a key factor in the decision to remake the game. Lenart additionally revealed that the original third-person combat system and certain story set pieces were completely rebuilt, while the presentation had been greatly improved by the implementation of motion capture to fully realize character emotions and cutscene depth.

Release 
Silent Hill 2 is set to be released for Windows and as a timed console exclusive for PlayStation 5 at launch, before being eligible for release on other platforms following one year.

References

Upcoming video games
Everyman
Konami games
Patricide in fiction
PlayStation 5 games
Psychological horror games
Silent Hill games
Single-player video games
Survival video games
Unreal Engine games
Uxoricide in fiction
Video game remakes
Video games developed in Poland
Video games about amnesia
Video games scored by Akira Yamaoka
Video games set in Maine
Video games set in prison
Video games set in psychiatric hospitals
Windows games
2020s horror video games